João Miguel Duarte Afonso (born 11 February 1982) is a Portuguese former professional footballer who played as a central defender.

Club career
Born in Lisbon, Afonso played lower league football until the age of 30, representing mainly S.C.U. Torreense and C.D. Mafra. In 2012, he signed a one-year contract for C.F. Belenenses in the Segunda Liga, making his professional debut on 14 October in a 1–0 home win against Portimonense S.C. and contributing with 16 games and two goals during the season as the club returned to the Primeira Liga after three years.

Afonso's first appearance in the Portuguese top flight took place on 18 August 2013 (at the age of 31 years and six months), as he featured the full 90 minutes in a 0–3 home loss to Rio Ave FC.

References

External links

1982 births
Living people
Footballers from Lisbon
Portuguese footballers
Association football defenders
Primeira Liga players
Liga Portugal 2 players
Segunda Divisão players
Odivelas F.C. players
F.C. Barreirense players
S.C.U. Torreense players
C.D. Olivais e Moscavide players
C.D. Mafra players
C.F. Os Belenenses players
S.U. Sintrense players